Paan Singh Tomar is a 2012 Indian Hindi-language biographical film about the eponymous athlete Paan Singh Tomar, a soldier in the Indian Army and seven-time national steeplechase champion, who later became a rebel against the system. The film is directed by Tigmanshu Dhulia and produced by UTV Motion Pictures. Irrfan Khan played the title role, with Mahie Gill, Vipin Sharma and Nawazuddin Siddiqui in the supporting cast.

The movie won the Best Feature Film and Best Actor awards in the 60th National Film Awards 2012.

Plot
A reporter interviewed Paan Singh Tomar (Irrfan Khan), a baaghi in the news for killing nine people of a community. Answering questions about himself, the story goes in a flashback from the year 1950. Paan Singh worked in the Army while his wife and mother live in Morena. He surprised his seniors in the army with his athletic skills. Though he was not interested in sports, he joined the sports division because there were no limits on their diet. Picked for the 5000 meters race's training, he was persuaded to run for the 3000 metres steeplechase by his coach. He participated in the Indian National Games and won the gold medal in the steeplechase event 7 years in a row. In 1958, he participated in the Asian Games at Tokyo, but failed to win because of his inability to adjust to the track spikes only given to him in the final event. He felt frustrated when he was not allowed to go to the borders to fight in the 1962 and 1965 wars because sportsmen were not allowed to fight in them. In 1967, he participated in the International Military Games and wins the gold medal in the steeplechase.

One day his brother came to visit him from his village and told him about some of their property being usurped by Bhanwar Singh, a relative. Paan Singh decided to retire from the army and left for his village to settle his family disputes, despite being offered a position as a coach in the army. Upon arriving home, he tried to resolve the issue with Bhanwar Singh. He even sought help from the District Collector and local police station, but no help was forthcoming. His son was then beaten up badly by Bhanwar Singh and his goons. To keep him safe Paan Singh ordered his son to join the army and asked him to stay away from the dispute. Eventually, Bhanwar Singh and his goons tried to kill Paan Singh and his family. Most of his family managed to escape but his mother was brutally murdered. Paan Singh decided to avenge his mother's death. He became a baaghi who engendered havoc in the Chambal Valley. He formed a gang of people in conflict with Bhanwar Singh.

Pann Singh then went into the business of extorting and kidnapping wealthy businessmen in the area to accumulate money and an arsenal for his people so that they can become a proper gang. After making all the necessary arrangements for arms and ammunition for gang members, he arranged a major attack on Bhanwar Singh, who had police protection. Bhanwar Singh killed by Paan Singh Tomar after a brief chase.

As an act of revenge for his brother's death, he killed nine villagers, who became police informers and had informed the police about his hideout. This event caused a furor in the nation, administration, and also among the other gangs of dacoits who urge him to surrender so that the manhunt by the police would be called off but he refused.

The interview with the reporter ends here and was published in the newspaper, causing a sensation. The police continued their search for Paan Singh Tomar, as a result, decided to lie low for a while. He met his family and his coach from the army who requested him to surrender. Paan Singh refused to surrender on the principle that while he was a sportsman holding a national record, nobody stood with him when he was facing problems, and the moment he decided to stand up for himself, he was branded a rebel and everyone wanted him arrested. When the gang reconvened after a month's hiatus, one of the members, Gopi (Nawazuddin Siddiqui) betrayed the gang by leading the police to their hideout. A shootout ensued where all members of the gang, including Paan Singh, killed by a police team led by Yashwant Singh Ghuraiya.

Cast
 Irrfan Khan as Paan Singh Tomar
 Mahie Gill as Indra Singh Tomar
 Hemendra Dandotiya as 
 Vipin Sharma as Major Masand
 Imran Hasnee as Matadeen Singh Tomar
 Nawazuddin Siddiqui as Gopi
 Zakir Hussain as Inspector Rathore
 Jahangir Khan as Bhanwar Singh (Daddaa)
 Sitaram Panchal as Ramcharan
 Rajendra Gupta as H.S. Randhawa (Sports Coach)
 Swapnil Kotriwar as Hanumant (Paan Singh's Elder Son)
 Brijendra Kala as Journalist
 Rajiv Gupta as Corrupt Cop
 Ravi Sah as Paan's nephew Balram

Production
Director Tigmanshu Dhulia first learned about Tomar while working on the set of Bandit Queen in Chambal. Intrigued that Tomar was largely forgotten despite holding several records, he resolved to make a film about his life. Dhulia worked for the film for two years, interviewing Tomar's surviving family members and visiting his native village in Bhind.

Dhulia wanted to make the film after fully researching Tomar. After world premiere in 2010, Dhulia was in dilemma whether he is glorifying Paan Singh Tomar or going to depicting his notoriety.

The film was shot in the ravines of Chambal, in Dholpur and in the actual barracks Tomar lived in at Roorkee. To prepare for his role, Irrfan Khan trained rigorously with steeplechase coaches, even breaking his ankle at one point during the filming. He called the experience "the most physically and mentally demanding film of my career".

Soundtrack 
The music was composed and arranged by Abhishek Ray. Since the film was a biopic locked in both time and geography, the original soundtrack and songs are strictly relevant to that. Abhishek Ray used different tribal instruments and folk voices pertaining to the hinterland of central India and fused them with larger-than-life symphonic orchestrations to capture the true essence of this poignant biopic set in the rugged Chambal ravines. The music of this epic film stands out for its authenticity, originality, and the perfect blend of central Indian folk with western classical influences.

Release
Paan Singh Tomar was released in India on 2 March 2012.

Critical reception
The New York Times praised Irrfan Khan's performance and  wrote "Without romanticizing Paan Singh Tomar, he shows his basic honesty and gives him real depth. As an actor Mr. Khan rarely does the expected. You can’t take your eyes off him.". Rajeev Masand of IBN awarded the film 3.5 out of 5 stars, praising Khan's performance and said "Directed competently by Dhulia, who's familiar and comfortable even with the dusty terrain, Paan Singh Tomar is made with great attention to detail and paints an honest, realistic picture of an India few of us can claim to know." Avijit Ghosh of The Times of India rated the film 4 out of 5 stars and said "Sportsmen and outlaws inhabit two different universes. One shines amidst the bright lights of glory, and the other haunts the ravines of notoriety. But in director Tigmanshu Dhulia's biopic, Paan Singh Tomar, the two worlds collide. And the result is a rather exquisite blend of drama, humour and tragedy; altogether eminently enjoyable good cinema". Aseem Chhabra for Rediff.com gave the film 3.5 out of 5 stars and said "The tragedy of Paan Singh Tomar and Irrfan Khan's execution of the role are both compelling." Taran Adarsh of Bollywood Hungama gave the film 3.5 out of 5 stars and said "Paan Singh Tomar shatters the standard rules of this genre. Besides, the film makes you cognizant that serious cinema can be uniformly delightful, like any other enthralling entertainer." Blessy Chettiar of DNA rated the film 4 out of 5 stars and said, "Gritty and power-packed, Paan Singh Tomar is a tribute to the unsung heroes of sports in India. Dhulia's direction and Irrfan's integrity will make [it] among the best movies of recent times.". Shubhra Gupta of The Indian Express gave the film 4 out of 5 stars and said "Paan Singh Tomar is a completely gripping, near-flawless film, with such few dodgy parts as to be negligible.".

Box office collection
Paan Singh Tomar grossed  in first week. The movie managed to gross  in the second week. The movie collected  in its third week and was declared a semi-hit by Box Office India.

Awards and nominations

References

External links
 
 
 
 

Indian biographical films
Films scored by Abhishek Ray
2010s Hindi-language films
2010 films
Films shot in Uttarakhand
Running films
Indian action films
Indian sports films
Biographical action films
Action films based on actual events
Drama films based on actual events
Sports films based on actual events
Biographical films about sportspeople
Cultural depictions of track and field athletes
Cultural depictions of robbers
Cultural depictions of Indian men
Best Feature Film National Film Award winners
Films shot in Madhya Pradesh
UTV Motion Pictures films
Films featuring a Best Actor National Award-winning performance
Films directed by Tigmanshu Dhulia
Films set in Uttar Pradesh
Films set in Madhya Pradesh
India at the Asian Games
Steeplechase at the Asian Games
Athletics at the 1958 Asian Games
Sino-Indian War films
Films based on Indo-Pakistani wars and conflicts